Velva may refer to:

Velva Darnell (1938–2014), American country and pop singer
Velva, North Dakota, a city in McHenry County, North Dakota, United States
 , a frazione of Castiglione Chiavarese, Italy
Aqua Velva, a line of men's grooming products
Aqua Velva (cocktail)